The N-25 or National Highway 25 is an 813 km national highway in Pakistan which extends along from Karachi in Sindh province to Chaman border via Quetta in [[Balochistan province of Pakistan. It was previously known as the Regional Cooperation for Development Highway (RCD Highway). Also known as killer highway

See also
Economic Cooperation Organization
Motorways of Pakistan
National Highways of Pakistan
Transport in Pakistan
National Highway Authority

References

External links
 National Highway Authority

Highways in Pakistan
Roads in Pakistan
Quetta District
Roads in Balochistan, Pakistan